Jesús Pascual Babiloni Soler (13 November 1946 – 22 February 2023) was a Spanish footballer who played as a left-back.

Babiloni died on 22 February 2023, at the age of 76.

Honours
Real Madrid
La Liga: 1968–69
Copa del Generalísimo: 1969–70

Castellón
Tercera División: 1964–65, 1965–66
Copa del Generalísimo: Runner-up 1972–73

Vall de Uxó
Tercera División: 1978–79

References

External links

1946 births
2023 deaths
Spanish people of Italian descent
Sportspeople from Castellón de la Plana
Spanish footballers
Footballers from the Valencian Community
Association football defenders
La Liga players
Segunda División players
Tercera División players
CD Castellón footballers
Real Madrid CF players